Harry True Lord (May 7, 1863 – September 1, 1923) was an American politician and lawyer who served as a Republican member of the New Hampshire Executive Council, President of the New Hampshire Senate, as a Member of the New Hampshire House of Representatives and as a member of and the President of the Manchester, New Hampshire Common Council.

Lord was born May 7, 1863 to Harrison Dearborn and Julia (True) Lord in Manchester, New Hampshire.

Lord graduated from Dartmouth College in 1887. For several years after he graduated from Dartmouth Lord worked as a school teacher.  His father encouraged him to study law and so he read for the law at the office of Hon. David Taggart and he was admitted to the New Hampshire Bar in 1894.

For several years after he graduated from Dartmouth Lord worked as a school teacher,

On September 27, 1897 Lord married Flora J. Cooper, and they had a daughter Elizabeth Lord born on July 13, 1899. After Flora died, Lord married Florence M. Stanley on October 16, 1912.

Notes

External links 
 * Portraits of Legislators On State House Third Floor Harry T. Lord

1863 births
1923 deaths
Republican Party New Hampshire state senators
New Hampshire lawyers
Dartmouth College alumni
Members of the Executive Council of New Hampshire
Republican Party members of the New Hampshire House of Representatives
Presidents of the New Hampshire Senate
19th-century American lawyers